Yossi Abu (born December 7, 1977) Is an Israeli executive who is the chief executive officer of NewMed Energy (formerly Delek Drilling) of the Delek corporation. In his former position he was a professional adviser to the Minister of Finance, Roni Bar-On.

Biography 
Yossi Abu was born in the Jerusalem District. Abu has a bachelor's degree in law from the Hebrew University of Jerusalem, which he graduated with honors, and he completed an internship in law at the lawyer's office Yigal Arnon in Tel Aviv.

In the years 2007–2009 Abu was a professional adviser to the Minister of Finance, Roni Bar-On (of the 17th Knesset of Israel) until in March 2009 he was appointed to Commerce and Regulations manager at Delek Energy.

In 2011 he was promoted to the position of NewMed Energy (Delek Drilling) CEO and has been filling this position since then. 

As NewMed Energy CEO, Abu led the development of the Tamar gas field, which was the first major off-shore natural gas finding in Israel, and today generates more than 60% of Israel's electricity. In addition, he led the discovering of the Leviathan Natural Gas reservoir finding in 2010 – one of the world's largest offshore gas finding of the past decade.

As CEO of NewMed Energy he led the financing of the Leviathan Project in the amount of $1.75 billion (The total investment in the first stage of the project was $3.75 billion), and the negotiations with Jordan and Egypt on signing regional export agreements of natural gas from Tamar and Leviathan Reservoirs with an estimated worth of $15 billion.

In 2016–2017 he was also CEO of Avner Oil and Gas until its merger with NewMed Energy (Delek Drilling) was signalized <-. From 2017 Abu is chair of Tamar petroleum (resigned during the year 2019) and as of 2018 he is also CEO of Delek Energy.

See also 
 Delek Group
 Leviathan gas field
 Tamar gas field

References

External links 
 Yossi abu's profile on the Delek drilling website
Israel looks to new Arab allies to export gas in volatile region, Financial Times, July 22, 2016

1977 births
Living people
Israeli chief executives
Israeli Jews
Hebrew University of Jerusalem Faculty of Law alumni
People from Jerusalem District
People in the petroleum industry